William Raymond Wallace  (born 1961) is a New Zealand politician. He served as mayor of Lower Hutt from 2010 to 2019.

Biography

Early life
Wallace was born in Kirkcaldy, Scotland, in 1961. 
He received his education at Te Aro Primary, St Mark's Church School and Wellington College. He has worked in real estate, health care, and the security industry. Wallace is married and lives in Wainuiomata.

Political career
Wallace stood for the National Party in the seat of Pencarrow (which covered much of Lower Hutt) at the 1990 general election. He lost to Labour's Sonja Davies.

Wallace was first elected to Hutt City Council in the Wainuiomata ward in a 1995 by-election, he served as deputy mayor from 2001 to 2004. Wallace first challenged incumbent David Ogden for the mayoralty in 2007 and came a close second in the three-person race. In the 2010 election, only Ogden and Wallace contested the mayoralty, and the latter won with a healthy majority. He won re-election in the 2013 local elections, achieving a significant majority over his only rival, Phil Stratford. Wallace and Stratford received 20,540 and 3,166 votes, respectively.

Wallace was known for his staunch opposition to "Super Cities" in New Zealand and fought against the proposal for one to occur in Wellington. In 2016 Wallace was re-elected to the mayoralty for a third term, 17,011 votes ahead of his nearest rival, James Anderson.

In June 2017 Wallace hit media headlines for his decision to retain rate payer funded meals. The motion was raised by Councillor Campbell Barry who believed elected members should pay for their own meals after the Council decided to introduce what he called "a sham Living Wage Policy". After a 7–6 vote, with Wallace voting in favour of retaining the meals, a public backlash engulfed the Council in controversy.

Wallace was defeated for the mayoralty by Labour Party councillor Campbell Barry at the 2019 local elections.

Post politics
Following his mayoral defeat he entered work as a real estate agent.

In the 2021 New Year Honours, Wallace was appointed an Officer of the New Zealand Order of Merit, for services to local government and the community.

References

External links
 

1961 births
Living people
Mayors of Lower Hutt
Deputy mayors of places in New Zealand
Scottish emigrants to New Zealand
People educated at Wellington College (New Zealand)
Unsuccessful candidates in the 1990 New Zealand general election
New Zealand National Party politicians
People from Kirkcaldy
Hutt City Councillors
Hutt Valley District Health Board members
Officers of the New Zealand Order of Merit
New Zealand justices of the peace